Montgomeryshire Wildlife Trust (Welsh: Ymddiriedolaeth Natur Maldwyn) is one of six wildlife trusts in Wales. It covers the vice-county of Montgomeryshire. and is based in Welshpool.

As at 2013 the trust had 20 reserves.
They include:

Cors Dyfi, the home of the Dyfi Osprey Project
Glaslyn in the Cambrian Mountains
Llanymynech Rocks near Llanymynech
Roundton Hill near Churchstoke

References

External links
 Wildlife Trusts Wales

Organisations based in Powys
Wildlife Trusts of Wales